The mile high club is slang for people who have had sexual intercourse on board an aircraft whilst in flight.

Mile High Club may also refer to:

 "Mile High Club", a song by Adam and the Ants from the 1981 album Prince Charming
 "Mile High Club", a song by Bow Wow Wow from the 1982 EP The Last of the Mohicans

See also
 Mild High Club, an American psychedelic pop band
 Mile High (disambiguation)